Cuddington was a village in Surrey which was demolished to make way for Henry VIII's Nonsuch Palace near Cheam. Cuddington lay within the Copthorne hundred. There remains a small rise of land to mark the northern side of the old Cuddington parish church.

The parish of Cuddington was part of Epsom Rural District and became part of the borough of Epsom and Ewell in 1933, with portions to the northeast and south becoming part of Cheam.

History
Cuddington lay within the Copthorne hundred, a strategic and judicial division predominantly used in Anglo Saxon England to supplement the county and parish (see vestry).

There was no ecclesiastical parish; the land was taxed with Ewell, but separately rated, with its own overseers.

It appears in Domesday Book of 1086 as Codintone. Its domesday assets were: 5 hides; 1 mill worth 3 shillings; and 9 ploughs. It rendered £9 12s.  Its total population was recorded as 28 households.

Henry VIII purchased the manor in 1538 from Richard Codington, who was the heir to his father's estate, and Elizabeth, Richard's wife (as was typical added as a trustee to override any interests she otherwise could have claimed for their offspring).

The whole of the former village of Cuddington, with its mansion and church, were swept away by Henry VIII to make room for the palace afterwards known as Nonsuch, and its two parks — the Great Park or Worcester Park containing , and the Little Park containing , part of which remains and part of which has been converted to residential areas of Ewell and Cheam. The palace was never fully completed by Henry VIII but was sufficient under Mary I of England to be used by Keeper of the Banqueting House, Sir Thomas Cawarden to entertain Gilles de Noailles, the French Ambassador.  The Tudor period historian and classical civilisation connoisseur John Leland praised the palace's design in Latin verse.

After the destruction of Nonsuch in 1671–2 the parkland was taken over by neighbouring farms. Within the current Nonsuch Park, where the palace once stood, is a small rise of land enclosing the foundation remains of the demolished chapel, parts of the masonry of which were used in the palace's construction.

The church of St Philip, Cheam Common, was built in 1876, and an ecclesiastical parish was formed for it in 1906 officially from "Cheam and Cuddington parish" however the latter term was long out of use and dropped by the Church of England.

References

History of Surrey
Former populated places in Surrey
Epsom and Ewell